Girolamo da Santacroce (c. 1480/85 – c. 1556) was a 16th-century Italian painter of the Renaissance period, active mainly in Venice and the Venetian mainland.

Life and work
Girolamo da Santacroce was born in Bergamo, Italy. He became in Venice a pupil of the painter Gentile Bellini. On Gentile's death in 1507, Santacroce was left in Gentile's will half of the Oriental drawings made be Gentile. Santacroce then most likely worked as an assistant in the workshops of Giovanni Bellini and Cima da Conegliano.

He was a prolific artist and many of his works are signed and dated.  He produced many copies after the works of the leading Venetian masters.  His work shows the influence of Titian and Palma Vecchio.

He is represented at the Musei Civici of Vicenza by a Madonna con il Bambino tra i santi Cosma e Damiano(?) It is unclear if he is related to a sculptor named Girolamo Santacroce in Naples.

Gallery

Secondary sources

References

External links

1480s births
1550s deaths
15th-century Italian painters
Italian male painters
16th-century Italian painters
Italian Renaissance painters
Painters from Venice
Year of birth uncertain